Lauren Parsekian Paul (born December 8, 1986) is an American director and actress, known for Finding Kind (2011). She founded the Kind Campaign in 2009.

Career
Parsekian founded the Kind Campaign in 2009, a non-profit organization and school program that brings awareness to the negative and lasting effects of girl-against-girl bullying. She directed and produced the documentary Finding Kind focused on girl-on-girl bullying.

Filmography

Film

Television

Personal life
Parsekian is of Armenian descent. Parsekian became engaged to Aaron Paul in Paris on January 1, 2012. The two met at the Coachella Festival. They were married on May 26, 2013, in a 1920s Parisian carnival-themed wedding in Malibu, California; Foster the People and John Mayer performed. Parsekian gave birth to the couple's first daughter, Story Annabelle, in February 2018. Parsekian welcomed the couple’s second child, son Ryden Caspian, in March 2022.

References

External links
 

21st-century American actresses
Living people
1986 births
American people of Armenian descent
Place of birth missing (living people)